Didi Kitumbo Mpiana (born 4 June 1985) is a retired Congolese football defender.

References 

1985 births
Living people
Democratic Republic of the Congo footballers
Democratic Republic of the Congo international footballers
Association football defenders
Democratic Republic of the Congo expatriate footballers
Expatriate footballers in Zambia
Democratic Republic of the Congo expatriate sportspeople in Zambia
FC Saint-Éloi Lupopo players
Zanaco F.C. players
21st-century Democratic Republic of the Congo people